Ermano Fegatilli (born 19 August 1984) is a Netherlands-based Italian boxer.

He is the former European Boxing Union Super Featherweight champion.

Personal life
Fegatilli holds a master's degree in Economics with the highest honours from Liège University, making him arguably the cleverest boxer in the world.
Hence his nickname Il Dottore.

Fegatilli combines work and boxing and is currently a full-time employee as a healthcare project consultant at the Möbius Business Redesign.

Boxing career

Amateur career
Fegatilli's amateur career was a rather short one, finishing at 25-2-2 and becoming Belgian champ in four consecutive years since 2001.

Professional career
Fegatilli started his professional career in 2005.  He is the Belgian Champion since 2008. 
In May 2007 he won the European Boxing Union European Union (EBU-EU) Super Featherweight title against Italian champion Antonio De Vitis.

 Fegatilli is ranked #9 by the WBC. and is therefore official title challenger for both the WBC and WBA world titles.

Fegatilli is being promoted by GMG Boxing Promotion and managed by Mirco Giuliani.

His trainers are Martin Jansen (head trainer/coach and cutman), Sandro Menconi (co-trainer), Urbano Giuliani and Dimitrios Mevroudis.

Winning the EBU Super Featherweight Championship

On 26 February 2011 Fegatilli won the EBU Super Featherweight Title by beating Stephen Foster Jr., 30, in the Premier Suite at Bolton’s Reebok Stadium, England, United Kingdom. This was Fegatilli's biggest win to date. Foster Jr. was knocked down a total of five times yet lasted to the final bell.
Relatively unknown and a 13-2 underdog before this fight, Il Dottore surprised many with the result.

Final scores were 140-110 and 114-109 twice, making Fegatilli the winner by unanimous decision. Foster was knocked down once in round nine, three times in round 10 and once more in round 11. Foster Jr. gave a good account of himself in the first seven rounds but Fegatilli's consistent body attack and high workrate proved to be too much for Foster Jr, who had stopped Levan Kirakosyan in three rounds in October 2010.

First title defense
Fegatilli was set to make a voluntary defense of his European title against tough Frenchmen and EBU-EU super featherweight champion Karim Chakim in October  but French promoter Gilbert Tesseron cancelled the fight just four days before it was to take place because of financial reasons.

Ermano defended his EBU title on 25 February against Italian Antonio De Vitis in the latter one's hometown of Savigliano, Italy. Fegatilli remained on the attack in a technically thrilling bout. A cut on the head of De Vitis caused a stoppage in round 6. Fegatilli won a close-but-clear majority decision.

Non-title fight
Because of the cancellation of the fight against Chakim Fegatilli's management was forced to organize a bout to keep Ermano's high world rank spot secured.

On 23 December 2011 Fegatilli faced Dutch-Nigerian boxer Innocent Anyanwu in Liege, Belgium. Ermano won the fight by unanimous decision.

Losing his title
On 21 July 2012 Fegatilli lost his title in a close and questionable decision to Italy's Devis Boschiero.

The fight was very close and entertaining to watch but on the scorecards but all three judges scored the contest for the local challenger Boschiero. Many people protested for a rematch.

Comeback
On 28 September 2012 Fegatilli returned home to Ghent to face journeyman Michael Isaac Carrero.

He dominated the overmatched Michael Carrero over eight rounds quite clearly winning a near-shutout Unanimous Decision.

Karim Chakim trilogy

On 29 March 2013 Ermano Fegatilli once again fought at the Topsportal - This time with vengeance in mind. In a trilogy fight with past rival Karim Chakim, Ermano Fegatilli fought past the French veteran in a highly impressive 80-72 victory. This fight sparked him back into Super Featherweight title contention.

Professional boxing record

| style="text-align:center;" colspan="8"|25 Wins (5 knockouts, 20 decisions),  4 Losses (0 knockouts, 4 decisions), 0 Draws
|-  style="text-align:center; background:#e3e3e3;"
|  style="border-style:none none solid solid; "|Res.
|  style="border-style:none none solid solid; "|Record
|  style="border-style:none none solid solid; "|Opponent
|  style="border-style:none none solid solid; "|Type
|  style="border-style:none none solid solid; "|Rd., Time
|  style="border-style:none none solid solid; "|Date
|  style="border-style:none none solid solid; "|Location
|  style="border-style:none none solid solid; "|Notes
|- align=center
|Win
|align=center|25-4||align=left| Antonio De Vitis
|
|
|
|align=left|
|align=left|
|- align=center
|Win
|align=center|24-4||align=left| Innocent Anyanwu
|
|
|
|align=left|
|align=left|
|- align=center
|Win
|align=center|23-4||align=left| Stephen Foster
|
|
|
|align=left|
|align=left|
|- align=center
|Win
|align=center|22-4||align=left| Pascal Bouchez
|
|
|
|align=left|
|align=left|
|- align=center
|Win
|align=center|21-4||align=left| Maurycy Gojko
|
|
|
|align=left|
|align=left|
|- align=center
|Win
|align=center|20-4||align=left| Samir Boukrara
|
|
|
|align=left|
|align=left|
|- align=center
|Win
|align=center|19-4||align=left| Alix Djavoiev
|
|
|
|align=left|
|align=left|
|- align=center
|Win
|align=center|18-4||align=left| Maurycy Gojok
|
|
|
|align=left|
|align=left|
|- align=center
|Win
|align=center|17-4||align=left| Jesus Garcia Escalona
|
|
|
|align=left|
|align=left|
|- align=center
|Win
|align=center|16-4||align=left| Pascal Bouchez
|
|
|
|align=left|
|align=left|
|- align=center
|Win
|align=center|15-4||align=left| Ivan Godor
|
|
|
|align=left|
|align=left|
|- align=center
|Loss
|align=center|14-4||align=left| Vitali Tajbert
|
|
|
|align=left|
|align=left|
|- align=center
|Win
|align=center|14-3||align=left| Araik Sachbazjan
|
|
|
|align=left|
|align=left|
|- align=center
|Win
|align=center|13-3||align=left| Gagik Martirosyan
|
|
|
|align=left|
|align=left|
|- align=center
|Loss
|align=center|12-3||align=left| Jesus Garcia Escalona
|
|
|
|align=left|
|align=left|
|- align=center
|Win
|align=center|12-2||align=left| Pascal Bouchez
|
|
|
|align=left|
|align=left|
|- align=center
|Win
|align=center|11-2||align=left| Antonio De Vitis
|
|
|
|align=left|
|align=left|
|- align=center
|Win
|align=center|10-2||align=left| Andrei Florin
|
|
|
|align=left|
|align=left|
|- align=center
|Loss
|align=center|9-2||align=left| Devis Boschiero
|
|
|
|align=left|
|align=left|
|- align=center
|Win
|align=center|9-1||align=left| Elemir Rafael
|
|
|
|align=left|
|align=left|
|- align=center
|Win
|align=center|8-1||align=left| Karim Chakim
|
|
|
|align=left|
|align=left|
|- align=center
|Loss
|align=center|7-1||align=left| Karim Chakim
|
|
|
|align=left|
|align=left|
|- align=center
|Win
|align=center|7-0||align=left| Robert Zsemberi
|
|
|
|align=left|
|align=left|
|- align=center
|Win
|align=center|6-0||align=left| Kamel Guerfi
|
|
|
|align=left|
|align=left|
|- align=center
|Win
|align=center|5-0||align=left| Andrei Florin
|
|
|
|align=left|
|align=left|
|- align=center
|Win
|align=center|4-0||align=left| Miloud Saadi
|
|
|
|align=left|
|align=left|
|- align=center
|Win
|align=center|3-0||align=left| Piotr Niesporek
|
|
|
|align=left|
|align=left|
|- align=center
|Win
|align=center|2-0||align=left| Damian Lawniczak
|
|
|
|align=left|
|align=left|
|- align=center
|Win
|align=center|1-0||align=left| Sergey Babushkin
|
|
|
|align=left|
|align=left|
|- align=center

References

External links 
Official website of Ermano Fegatilli
Ermano Fegatilli's boxing record from BoxRec
European Boxing Union
AFAV Advanced Fighter Video Analysis
Ermano Fegatilli on mixfight

See also
 British Scene: Stephen Foster vs Ermano Fegatilli Preview
 List of European Boxing Union super featherweight champions

1984 births
Living people
People from Seraing
Belgian people of Italian descent
Super-featherweight boxers
Italian male boxers